Buxtehuder SV is a German sports club based in Buxtehude, Lower Saxony. The club is best known for its women's handball team, currently competing in the Handball-Bundesliga Frauen and 2022-23 Women's EHF European League, but also has departments for many other sports, including association football, athletics, swimming, boxing, gymnastics, and volleyball.

Honours
Handball-Bundesliga Frauen:
Silver (3): 2003, 2012, 2015
Bronze (6): 2001, 2009, 2011, 2014, 2018, 2022
DHB-Pokal:
Winner (2): 2015, 2017
EHF Challenge Cup:
Winners (1): 2010
Finalist (1): 2002

Crest, colours, supporters

Kits

Squad

Current squad
Squad for the 2022-23 season.

Goalkeepers
 12  Marie Andresen
 16  Lea Rühter
Wingers
LW
 23  Lucia Kollmer
 28  Teresa von Prittwitz
RW
 4  Johanna Heldmann	
 5  Maj Nielsen
PV
 10  Maxi Mühlner
 29  Cara Hartstock

Back players
LB
 2  Liv Süchting (c)
 17  Charlotte Kähr
 33  Mia Lakenmacher
 77  Magda Kašpárková
CB
 14  Maja Schönefeld
 25  Sinah Hagen
RB
 11  Isabelle Dölle
 13  Mailee Winterberg

Staff members
  Head Coach: Dirk Leun
  Assistant Coach: Adrian Fuladjusch
  Goalkeeping Coach: Debbie Klijn

Transfers 
Transfers for the 2023-24 season.

Joining

Leaving

Notable players

 Camilla Andersen
 Heike Axmann
 Andrea Bölk
 Emily Bölk
 Isabell Klein
 Debbie Klijn
 Christine Lindemann
 Stefanie Melbeck
 Suzanne Petersen

 Melanie Schliecker
 Heike Schmidt
 Michelle Goos
 Friederike Gubernatis
 Jasmina Janković
 Willemijn Karsten
 Diane Lamein
 Ulrika Toft Hansen

References

External links

Multi-sport clubs in Germany
German handball clubs
Football clubs in Germany
Football clubs in Lower Saxony
1862 establishments in Germany
Women's handball clubs
Women's handball in Germany
Sport in Lower Saxony
Stade (district)